Rulfo is a surname. Notable people with the surname include:

Juan Rulfo (1917–1986), Mexican writer, screenwriter, and photographer
Juan Carlos Rulfo (born 1964), Mexican screenwriter and director, son of Juan
Juan Carlos García Rulfo (born 1981), Mexican footballer

See also
Ruffo